Moneyreagh or Moneyrea is a small village and townland in County Down, Northern Ireland. It is just off the main road between Belfast and Ballygowan. It is situated in the civil parish of Comber and the historic barony of Castlereagh Lower. It had a population of 1,594 people in the 2021 Census.

History
On the 26 May 1942 a Royal Air Force, Bristol Beaufighter (X7573) crashed near village shortly after taking off from RAF Ballyhalbert, killing all Three crew.

Demography

2011 Census 
On Census Day, 27 March 2011, the usual resident of the Moneyreagh Settlement was 1,384 (519 households).

 17.92% were aged under 16 years and 13.37% were aged 65 and over
 50.29% of the usually resident population were male and 49.71% were female
 44 was the average (median) age of the population
 99.71% were from the white (including Irish Traveller) ethnic group
 2.24% belong to or were brought up as Catholic
 90.39% belong to or were brought as 'Protestant and other Christian (including Christian related)' religion
 83.31% indicated that they had a British national identity, 2.53% had an Irish national identity and 29.77% had a Northern Irish national identity.

Respondents could indicate more than one national identity.

Language 

 1.04% had some knowledge of the Irish Language
 9.07% had some knowledge of the Ulster Scots Language
 0.30% did not have English as their first language

Education

Primary 
Moneyreagh has one primary school locally, seen at the top of the table below.

Other schools nearby have been added also.

Secondary 
Moneyreagh does not have any secondary schools locally.

Those located nearby (<10 mi (16 km) away) are shown in the table below:

Notable People 
Golfer, Rory McIlroy, lived near the village until March 2013.

Transport 
Moneyreagh is connected to Belfast City Centre by the 12/512 bus route ran by Translink. This route also connects Moneyreagh to the neighbouring small town of Ballygowan.

See also 

 List of villages in Northern Ireland
 List of towns in Northern Ireland

References

Villages in County Down
Townlands of County Down
Civil parish of Comber
Aviation accidents and incidents locations in Northern Ireland